Beyond Queer: Challenging Gay Left Orthodoxy is a 1996 anthology edited by Bruce Bawer.

Summary
The book is an anthology of essays on gay politics. Contributing writers are:

Bruce Bawer
John W. Berresford
David Boaz
Stephen H. Chapman
Mel Dahl
Yaakov Levado
David Link
Carolyn Lochhead
Daniel Mendelsohn
Stephen H. Miller
James P. Pinkerton
Jonathan Rauch
Thomas H. Stahel
Andrew Sullivan
Paul Varnell
Norah Vincent
John Weir

Publication history
Beyond Queer was first published in 1996 by Free Press, a division of Simon & Schuster.

Reception
Beyond Queer was a finalist at the 9th Lambda Literary Awards in the nonfiction anthologies category. Booklist called it one of the "outstanding anthologies" of 1996, saying that it "marks the end of radical dominance in gay politics and culture" and "the beginning of a pragmatic and democratic approach to gay issues". Ron Hayes, writing in The Palm Beach Post, called it "complex, unsettling and thought provoking" and maintained that "No straight person who reads these essays will ever assume all gays are liberal again. And no gay person will ever assume that all conservatives are his enemy, either."

To read the essays in Beyond Queer, wrote Joseph Bottum in the Weekly Standard, "is to experience, again and again, this sense of language broken loose, words unmoored from meaning". Bottum argued that the book's contributors fail "to understand the internal logic of the forms of life to which they demand admittance"; they "want... the tradition without the discipline, the gravity of dogmatic religion and conventional marriage without the duties and surrenders that create gravity. They want, in other words, a reformation of language to purchase for them the fruits that require a reformation of life."

References

Bibliography
Books

Periodicals

1996 non-fiction books
1996 anthologies
1990s LGBT literature
American anthologies
American non-fiction books
Essay anthologies
LGBT anthologies
LGBT literature in the United States
Free Press (publisher) books